WAIA (1600 AM) was a radio station formerly licensed to Beaver Dam, Kentucky, United States. The station was owned by Starlight Broadcasting Co., Inc.

History
The station originally signed on on June 21, 1969.  Before October 1, 1996, it was WLLS, a daytime-only simulcast of WLLS-FM. The station changed its callsign to WSNR on October 1, 1996. On March 26, 2001, the station changed its callsign again to WAIA.

Starlight Broadcasting surrendered the station's license to the Federal Communications Commission (FCC) on June 26, 2012. The station's license was cancelled and its call sign deleted from the FCC's database on July 19, 2012.

Before permanently signing off, both WAIA and WXMZ served as a simulcast of WKYA of Greenville. In 2012, after WAIA went off the air, WXMZ began broadcasting its own station programming, and it, too, began running an Oldies format, and moved to a frequency of 99.9 MHz.

References

External links

AIA
ESPN Radio stations
Radio stations established in 1969
Radio stations disestablished in 2012
Defunct radio stations in the United States
1969 establishments in Kentucky
2012 disestablishments in Kentucky
AIA